John Williams Shackelford (November 16, 1844 – January 18, 1883) was a Democratic U.S. Congressman from North Carolina between 1881 and 1883.

Biography
Shackelford was born in Richlands, North Carolina, the descendant of an early Virginia family which had settled at Shacklefords, Virginia. He enlisted in the Confederate Army at the age of 17 and rose to the rank of lieutenant during the war. In 1872, he was elected to the North Carolina House of Representatives, where he served for six years, when he was elected to the North Carolina Senate. After a single two-year term in the Senate, he was elected to the 47th United States Congress in 1880. Shackelford died in Washington, D.C., during his first and only term in office, in January 1883. He is buried in his hometown of Richlands.

Notes

See also
List of United States Congress members who died in office (1790–1899)

References
 Retrieved on 2009-04-30

Further reading
  Memorial Addresses on the Life and Character of John W. Shackelford Delivered in the House of Representatives and the Senate, Government Printing Office, Washington, 1883

1844 births
1883 deaths
Confederate States Army officers
Democratic Party members of the North Carolina House of Representatives
Democratic Party North Carolina state senators
Democratic Party members of the United States House of Representatives from North Carolina
19th-century American politicians
People from Richlands, North Carolina